George Keenlyside (4 August 1889–1967) was an English footballer who played in the Football League for Hartlepools United and South Shields.

References

1889 births
1967 deaths
English footballers
Association football forwards
English Football League players
Sunderland A.F.C. players
Jarrow F.C. players
Partick Thistle F.C. players
Gateshead A.F.C. players
Hartlepool United F.C. players
Chester-le-Street Town F.C. players